Alan Trevor Lewis (19 August 1954 – 21 May 2016) was an English professional footballer who played as a left back.

Career
Born in Oxford, Lewis played for Derby County, Peterborough United, Brighton & Hove Albion, Reading, and Witney Town.

References

1954 births
2016 deaths
English footballers
Derby County F.C. players
Peterborough United F.C. players
Sheffield Wednesday F.C. players
Brighton & Hove Albion F.C. players
Reading F.C. players
Witney Town F.C. players
English Football League players
Association football fullbacks